Glenalvin J. Goodridge (1829 – November 14, 1867) was an American photographer. He was among the first African-American photographers in the United States.

Early life and career
Goodridge was born in York, Pennsylvania, the first son of William C. Goodridge, an ex-slave. He married his wife, Rhoda Cornelia Grey, on June 10, 1851, and their son Glen J. Goodridge was born in 1860.

From 1847 to 1851, Goodridge was primarily a teacher at the "Colored High School" in York, a role he continued part-time thereafter. Nationally known abolitionist Frances Harper taught at the same school beginning in 1864.

With his brothers, Wallace Goodridge and William O. Goodridge, he operated a photo studio in York, and later in East Saginaw, Michigan. The Saginaw studio was closed by Wallace in 1922.

Incarceration and later years
From 1863 to 1864, Goodridge was incarcerated in the Eastern State Penitentiary after being convicted on a charge of rape. Following a campaign by his father, Pennsylvania governor Andrew G. Curtin pardoned Goodridge. While incarcerated, he contracted tuberculosis, which led to his death in Minneapolis on November 14, 1867. Goodridge is buried at the Minneapolis Pioneers and Soldiers Memorial Cemetery.

Legacy
In 2018, a reproduction of the photo studio he operated with his brothers, Wallace and William O., opened within the Goodridge Freedom Center in York, Pennsylvania.
In 2021, many of his daguerreotypes were acquired for the collection of the Smithsonian American Art Museum.

References

19th-century African-American people
1829 births
1867 deaths
19th-century American photographers
People from York, Pennsylvania
Tuberculosis deaths in Minnesota
19th-century deaths from tuberculosis